Tunstall is an unincorporated community in New Kent County, Virginia, United States.

Foster's Castle and Hampstead, both located in Tunstall, are listed on the National Register of Historic Places.

References

Unincorporated communities in Virginia
Unincorporated communities in New Kent County, Virginia